The 1947 San Diego State Aztecs football team represented San Diego State College during the 1947 college football season.

San Diego State competed in the California Collegiate Athletic Association (CCAA). The team was led by first-year head coach Bill Schutte, and played home games at both Aztec Bowl and Balboa Stadium. They finished the season with seven wins, three losses and one tie (7–3–1, 2–2–1 CCAA). Overall, the team outscored its opponents 191–156 for the season. At the end of the season, the Aztecs were chosen to play in the 1948 Harbor Bowl against the Hardin–Simmons Cowboys. The game was played at Balboa Stadium in San Diego, California on January 1, 1948. The Aztecs were beaten 0–53 in the game.

Schedule

Team players in the NFL
No San Diego State players were selected in the 1948 NFL Draft.

Notes

References

San Diego State
San Diego State Aztecs football seasons
San Diego State Aztecs football